Marcus Nash (born 15 February 1994) is a former Scottish actor who's now Head of Media & Communications at Ipswich Town FC. Initially known for starring as Herod Sharkey in the CBBC television series Half Moon Investigations, based on the best-selling novels by Eoin Colfer. Marcus has starred in BBC Scotland soap River City and also has an appearance in Peter Mullan's film ''Neds. Following his acting career, Nash was Head of Communications at Hamilton Academical FC from May 2018, before joining the tractor boys in August 2021.

Film

Television

External links

Scottish male child actors
1994 births
Living people
Male actors from Glasgow
Scottish male television actors
Scottish male film actors
Scottish journalists